Ernest Davidson may refer to:

 Ernest R. Davidson (born 1936), professor of chemistry
 Ernest A. Davidson, American architect